The 2019 NCAA Division II football season, part of college football in the United States organized by the National Collegiate Athletic Association (NCAA) at the Division II level, began on August 31 and ended on December 21 with the Division II championship at the McKinney Independent School District Stadium in McKinney, Texas, hosted by the Lone Star Conference.

Conference changes and new programs

Membership changes

Davenport completed its transition to Division II and became eligible for the postseason.

Conference standings

Super Region 1

Super Region 2

Super Region 3

Super Region 4

Postseason

Super Region 1

Super Region 2

Super Region 3

Super Region 4

Semifinals
Teams that advanced to the semifinals were seeded.

See also

2019 NCAA Division I FBS football season
2019 NCAA Division I FCS football season
2019 NCAA Division III football season
2019 NAIA football season

References